Li Jie (born February 3, 1973, in Jinhua, Zhejiang) is a male Chinese sports shooter who competed in the 2004 Summer Olympics.

He competed in the men's 10 metre running target event and finished sixth.

External links
 profile

1973 births
Living people
Olympic shooters of China
People from Jinhua
Running target shooters
Shooters at the 2004 Summer Olympics
Sport shooters from Zhejiang
Chinese male sport shooters